Anadia rhombifera, the rhombifer anadia, is a species of lizard in the family Gymnophthalmidae. It is found in Colombia and Ecuador.

References

Anadia (genus)
Reptiles described in 1859
Taxa named by Albert Günther